Lane Kenworthy is an American professor of sociology and political science. He has worked at the University of Arizona since 2004, being a full professor since 2007. He is known for his statistical and analytic work on the economic effects of income and wealth distribution. He currently teaches at the University of California, San Diego.

He advocates incremental reforms to the U.S. welfare state in the direction of the social-democratic Nordic model, thereby increasing economic security and equal opportunity.

Biography 
Kenworthy was born in New York City and grew up in Atlanta. He received a B.A. in sociology from Harvard University in 1986 and a Ph.D. in sociology from the University of Wisconsin–Madison in 1993. Kenworthy's dissertation was supervised by Joel Rogers, Erik Olin Wright, and Wolfgang Streeck.

Kenworthy worked as assistant professor of sociology at Rochester Institute of Technology 1994–1995 and held the same position at East Carolina University 1995–2000. He worked as assistant professor at Emory University 2000–2004. As of 2014, he is a professor of sociology and political science at the University of Arizona.

Kenworthy played forward for the United States national youth soccer team.

Income inequality 
About income inequality, Kenworthy wrote:
As best I can tell from the available data, income inequality hasn't reduced economic growth. It hasn't hindered employment. It may or may not have played a role in fostering economic crises, including the Great Recession. It hasn't reduced income growth for poor households. [...] It may or may not have reduced equality of opportunity. [...] Income inequality has reduced middle-class household income growth. It very likely has increased disparities in education, health, and happiness in the United States. And it has reduced residential mixing in the U.S.

Selected bibliography

Books 
 In Search of National Economic Success (1995) SAGE. 
 Egalitarian Capitalism: Jobs, Incomes, and Growth in Affluent Countries. (2004) Russell Sage Foundation. 
 Jobs with Equality (2008) Oxford University Press, USA 
 Progress for the Poor (2011) Oxford University Press, USA. 
 Social Democratic America (2014) Oxford University Press, USA. 
 Social Democratic Capitalism (2019) Oxford University Press, USA.

Articles 
 
  Pdf.
  Pdf.
  Pdf.

References

External links 
 Official site
 Official page, U. of AZ
 
 
 
 

American sociologists
American social sciences writers
Harvard University alumni
Living people
University of Wisconsin–Madison College of Letters and Science alumni
University of Arizona faculty
American social democrats
Year of birth missing (living people)